Quimper is a railway station in Quimper, Brittany, France. The station was opened on 8 September 1863 is located on the Savenay–Landerneau railway.  Today, the station is served by TGV (high speed), Intercités (long distance) and TER (local) services operated by the SNCF.

Train services

The station is served by high speed trains to Vannes and Paris, and regional trains to Brest, Lorient, Nantes and Rennes.

References

Railway stations in Finistère
TER Bretagne
Railway stations in France opened in 1863
Quimper